Nicholas Robert Moore (born December 9, 1992) is an American football long snapper for the Baltimore Ravens of the National Football League (NFL). He played college football at Georgia.

Baseball career
Moore spent four seasons in the minor league system of the Boston Red Sox after being drafted in the 30th round of the 2011 MLB draft out of high school. He primarily played for the Lowell Spinners at  first base and third base.

College career
Moore played college football at Georgia, where he was recruited to play linebacker and also played fullback. He switched to long snapper in 2017. He competed in 23 games over his Bulldogs career, including 14 as a senior in 2018.

Professional career

New Orleans Saints
Moore went undrafted during the 2019 NFL Draft. Moore signed with the New Orleans Saints as an undrafted free agent on April 28, 2019. He was waived on August 21, 2019.

Tampa Bay Vipers
Moore signed with the Tampa Bay Vipers of the XFL after being drafted in Phase 5 of the 2020 XFL Draft. The league suspended its season after six games, and allowed players to sign with NFL teams starting on March 23, 2020.

Baltimore Ravens
Moore signed with the Baltimore Ravens three days later. He was waived during final roster cuts on September 5, 2020, and signed to the Ravens' practice squad the next day. He was elevated to the active roster on December 2 for the team's week 12 game against the Pittsburgh Steelers after Morgan Cox was placed on the COVID-19 list, and reverted to the practice squad after the game. On January 18, 2021, Moore signed a reserve/futures contract with the Ravens. On January 25, 2021, the Ravens announced that they would be parting ways with Morgan Cox and going with Nick Moore for the next season.

On March 9, 2022, the Ravens placed an exclusive-rights free agent tender on Moore.

References

External links
Georgia Bulldogs bio

1992 births
Living people
American football long snappers
Georgia Bulldogs football players
Tampa Bay Vipers players
Baltimore Ravens players
Lowell Spinners players
People from Snellville, Georgia
Players of American football from Georgia (U.S. state)
Gulf Coast Red Sox players
Greenville Drive players
Salem Red Sox players
Sportspeople from the Atlanta metropolitan area